The Jaintia tube-nosed bat (Murina jaintiana) is a species of vesper bats (Vespertilionidae). It is found in India and Myanmar.

References

Murininae
Mammals of India
Mammals of Myanmar
Mammals described in 2012